The Men's Softball World Cup, known through 2015 as the ISF Men's World Championship, is a softball tournament for the best national men's teams in the world. From 1966 to 2013 it was held every four years, first by the International Softball Federation (ISF) and from 2019 an onward it is held every two years by the World Baseball Softball Confederation (WBSC), the 16 best teams in the world compete.

Results

In 1976 the final day was rained out.  New Zealand, USA and Canada were all awarded the gold medal.

Medal table

Participating nations
 
 
 
 

Records and statistics
All statistics are up to date to the end of the 2022 Men's Softball World Championship.

Individual
 Highest batting average 0.647, Clark Bosh (Canada, 1988)

 Most Stolen Bases 6, Brian Rothrock (United States, 1988); Marty Kernaghan (Canada, 1988)

 Most Doubles 7, Bob McKinnon (Canada, 1988)

 Most Triples 4, Redelio Cruz (Cuba, 1988); Mark Sorenson and Taifau Matai (New Zealand, 1996)

 Most Home Runs 8, Brian Rothrock (United States, 1988); Marty Kernaghan (Canada, 1988)

 Most Runs Scored 19, Marty Kernaghan (Canada, 1988)

 Most Hits 21, Crestwell Pratt (Bahamas, 1988); Bob McKinnon (Canada, 1988)

 Most RBI's 23, Brian Rothrock (United States, 1988)

 Most Innings pitched 59, Ty Stofflet (United States, 1976)

 Most strikeouts 98, Ty Stofflet (United States, 1976)

 Most strikeouts in a single game 32, Ty Stofflet (United States, 1976)

 Most consecutive scoreless innings 59, Ty Stofflet (United States, 1976)

Team

 Highest batting average 0.404, Canada (1998)

 Most Runs 142, Canada (1998)

 Most RBI's 125, Canada (1998)

 Most Home-Runs 37, Canada (1998)

 Most Hits 142, United States (1998)

 Lowest ERA 0.19, United States (1976)

See also
Women's Softball World Championship

References

 
Men's
Recurring sporting events established in 1966
World Baseball Softball Confederation competitions